Mullen Technologies, Inc. is an American automotive and electric vehicle manufacturer based in Brea, California. Mullen Auto Sales division is engaged in car dealership, through its subsidiary CarHub, a chain of car dealerships in California and Arizona.

History
David Michery is the founder, chairman, and CEO of Mullen Technologies since 2012. Mullen originally intended to launch the Dragonfly K50 (also known as Qiantu K50) luxury sports car by 2021. The company intends to field a luxury model first, then pivot to all-consumer electric vehicle models.

On June 15, 2020, Mullen Technologies announced a merger agreement with Net Element, Inc.

On March 17, 2021, Mullen Technologies announced that they would be opening a factory in Memphis, Tennessee, US for the manufacture of their Mullen FIVE crossover SUV, with plans to sell these models as early as 2024.

In April 2022, an article by Hindenburg Research presents Mullen as one of the worst hustle in recent history.

In September 2022 Mullen purchased a controlling stake in Bollinger Motors, the manufacturer of EV pick-ups und SUVs.

In October 2022, Mullen bought the bankrupt company ELMS (Electric Last Mile Solutions).

Mullen I-Go

The Mullen I-Go is an electric city car unveiled by Mullen Automotive in October 2022. Being essentially a rebadged Chinese Xiaohu FEV, the I-Go serves as a last mile delivery vehicle featuring a 16.5 kWh battery pack that provides 124 miles (200 km) of range in the New European Driving Cycle. The battery powers a 46 hp (34 kW / 46 PS) electric motor and enables the vehicle to hit a top speed of 62 mph (100 km/h).

References

Car manufacturers of the United States
Battery electric vehicle manufacturers
Plug-in hybrid vehicle manufacturers
Sports car manufacturers
Electric vehicle manufacturers of the United States
Motor vehicle manufacturers based in California
2014 establishments in California
Companies based in Brea, California
American companies established in 2014
Automotive companies established in 2014